Twelve members are nominated to the Rajya Sabha by the President of India for six-years term for their contributions towards arts, literature, sciences, and social services. This right has been bestowed upon the President according to the Fourth Schedule (Articles 4(1) and 80(2)) of the Constitution of India.

Current members 
This is a Current list of Members of the Rajya Sabha who have been nominated by the President.

Past members
This is a Complete list of Members of the Rajya Sabha who have been nominated by the President.

References

External links
 Nominated Members since 1952 Narender Kumar 
 Current list of Nominated Members
 Newly Appointed Members on July 14, 2018

Lists of members of the Rajya Sabha